New Trier Township is one of 29 townships in Cook County, Illinois, United States. As of the 2020 census, its population was 57,371.

The township contains New Trier High School, but the borders of the school district do not line up exactly with the borders of the township.

Geography
The township comprises the villages of Wilmette, Kenilworth, Winnetka, Glencoe, and portions of Glenview and Northfield. There is also a small unincorporated area near Winnetka known as Indian Hill because of the nearby country club of the same name.

Cities, Towns, Villages
Glencoe (vast majority)
Kenilworth
Northfield (eastern third)
Wilmette
Winnetka

Unincorporated Town
Indian Hill at

Ghost Town
Gross Point at

Demographics

As of the 2020 census, there were 57,371 people living in the township. The population density was approximately 3,500/sq mi (1,400/km2). There were 21,114 housing units. The racial makeup of the township was 82.5% White, 8.8% Asian, 0.8% Black or African American, 1.1% from other races, and 6.8% from two or more races. Hispanic or Latino of any race were 4.6% of the population.

The median age in the township was 45.8 years. 29.3% of the population was under 18 years, and 19.7% were 65 years or older.

There were 20,447 households, out of which 38.9% had people under the age of 18 living with them, and 35.9% had people 65 years or older living with them. 69.2% of households were married couples living together, 19.5% had a female householder with no spouse present, 10.3% had a male householder with no spouse present, and 1.0% were cohabiting couples living together. The average household size was 2.72 and the average family size 3.20.

The median income for a household in the township was $177,672, and the median income for a family was $227,204. 3.3% of residents were below the poverty line.

Township services
 Angel Fund - provides emergency assistance to pay for food, shelter, medical care, and other necessities. Funded fully by private donations, it is utilized by those who are not eligible for assistance from other funds.
 Access to Care - a suburban Cook County program that helps uninsured and underinsured residents get discounted medical services and prescription medication.
 Assessor's Assistance - the Township Assessor's Office assists taxpayers with property tax issues.
 Child Care Scholarships
 Dial-a-Ride - provides discounted taxi fares to senior citizens traveling within the township.
 Employment Counseling
 Escorted Transportation
 General Assistance and Emergency Aid
 Handicap Parking Tags
 Pantry
 Peer Jury - provides an alternative to the traditional criminal justice system for non-violent first-time juvenile offenders.
 Voter Registration

See also
 Trier in Germany

References

External links
New Trier Township official website
City-data.com
Cook County Official Site

Townships in Cook County, Illinois
Townships in Illinois